Zvuki Mu (roughly translated as "Sounds of Moo") was a Russian alternative rock/indie/post-punk band founded in Moscow in 1983. Lead singer and songwriter Pyotr Mamonov was one of the most revered and eccentric figures of the Russian art scene, whose absurdist lyrics are as playful and disturbing as his vocal style and explosive on-stage presence.

The 2013 video for The National's single "Sea of Love", directed by Sophia Peer, was based on Zvuki Mu's video for Grubyj Zakat. In 2015, Mamonov reunited the band with new members, called "Brand new Zvuki Mu".

Discography 
 1988 — Simple Things / "Простые Вещи" / "Simple Things"
 1989 — Zvuki Mu / Звуки Му / "Sounds of Mu"
 1991 — Transnadyozhnost'/ Транснадёжность / "Transreliability"
 1992 — Mamonov I Aleksey / Мамонов И Алексей / "Mamonov and Aleksey"
 1994 — Krym / Крым / "Crimea" (recorded 1988)
 1995 — Grubiy Zakat / Грубый Закат / "Rough Sunset"
 1995 — Instrumental'nie Variatsii / Инструментальные Вариации / "Instrumental Variations"
 1996 — Zhizn' Amfibiy Kak Ona Est' / Жизнь Амфибии Как Она Есть / "Life Of Amphibians As It Is"
 1996 — Prostie Veshi / Простые Вещи / "Simple Things" (recorded 1988)
 1996 — Mamonov 84-87
 1997 — Legendy Ruskogo Roka / Легенды Русского Рока / "Legends of Russian Rock"
 1999 — Shkura Neubitogo / Шкура Неубитого / " Pelt of Unkilled"
 2000 — Nabral Khoroshih Na Odin Kompakt / Набрал Хороших На Один Компакт / "Have Picked Good (Songs) On One Compact (Disk)"
 2000 — Shokoladniy Pushkin / Шоколадный Пушкин / "Chocolate Pushkin"
 2002 — Shkura Neubitogo 2 / Шкура Неубитого 2 / "Pelt of Unkilled 2"
 2002 — Elektro T / Электро T / "Electro T"
 2003 — Myshi 2002 / Мыши 2002 / "Mice 2002"
 2003 — Zelyonenkiy / Зелёненький / "(Little) Green"
 2003 — Velikoe Molchanie Vagona Metro / Великое Молчание Вагона Метро / "The Great Silence of Metro Wagon"
 2005 — Skazki Bratiev Grimm / Сказки Братьев Грим / "Tales of The Brothers Grimm"
 2022 — Neznayka / Незнайка / "Dunno"

References

External links 
 
 Zvuki Mu discography on Discogs

Musical groups established in 1983
Musical groups disestablished in 1990
Musical groups reestablished in 1993
Musical groups disestablished in 2005
Musical groups reestablished in 2015
Musical groups disestablished in 2021
1983 establishments in the Soviet Union
1990 disestablishments in the Soviet Union
1993 establishments in Russia
2005 disestablishments in Russia
2015 establishments in Russia
2021 disestablishments in Russia
Musical groups from Moscow
Russian rock music groups
Russian post-punk music groups
Russian alternative rock groups
Russian experimental rock groups
Soviet rock music groups